Jaime Orlando Baeza Zet (born 28 February 1962) is a Chilean former footballer.

For two and half months, Baeza was caretaker president of the ANFP after Sergio Jadue's resignation.

References

1958 births
Living people
Association football forwards
Chilean footballers
Olympic footballers of Chile
Footballers at the 1984 Summer Olympics
Everton de Viña del Mar footballers
University of Valparaíso alumni
Presidents of the ANFP
Everton de Viña del Mar managers